Dəymədağlı (also, Daymadagly and Deymadagly) is a village and municipality in the Qakh Rayon of Azerbaijan.  It has a population of 729.

References 

Populated places in Qakh District